The 1958 Soviet football championship was the 26th seasons of competitive football in the Soviet Union and the 20th among teams of sports societies and factories. Spartak Moscow won the championship becoming the Soviet domestic champions for the seventh time.

Honours

Notes = Number in parentheses is the times that club has won that honour. * indicates new record for competition

Soviet Union football championship

Class A

Class B (final stage)

 [Nov 5-22, Tbilisi]

Top goalscorers

Class A
Anatoliy Ilyin (Spartak Moscow) – 19 goals

References

External links
 1958 Soviet football championship. RSSSF